The A.A. Salazar House, at 603 Main St. in San Luis, Colorado, United States, is a Queen Anne-style house built in 1906.  It was listed on the National Register of Historic Places in 1998.

It is a residence built of ornamental concrete blocks.

It was built for Antonio A. and Genoveva Gallegos Salazar. 

The property was occupied as a bed and breakfast for some time.

References

National Register of Historic Places in Costilla County, Colorado
Queen Anne architecture in Colorado
Houses completed in 1906
1906 establishments in Colorado
Ornamental block buildings